Dóra Deáki (born 11 April 1991 in Győr) is a retired Hungarian handballer.

A Product of the Győri ETO KC youth system, she made her senior debut for the team in 2007.

In 2009, she was member of the Hungarian national team that won silver medal on the Junior European Championship.

Achievements
Nemzeti Bajnokság I:
Winner: 2008, 2009, 2010
Silver Medalist: 2012, 2013
Bronze Medalist: 2011
Magyar Kupa:
Winner: 2008, 2009, 2010
EHF Champions League:
Finalist: 2009
Semifinalist: 2008, 2010
EHF Cup Winners' Cup:
Winner: 2011, 2012
Junior European Championship:
Silver Medallst: 2009

References

External links
 Dóra Deáki player profile on Ferencvárosi TC Official Website
 Dóra Deáki career statistics at Worldhandball

1991 births
Living people
Sportspeople from Győr
Hungarian female handball players
Győri Audi ETO KC players
Siófok KC players